Peter of Pappacarbone (died 4 March 1123) was an Italian abbot, bishop, and saint.  He was abbot of La Trinità della Cava, located at Cava de' Tirreni.  Born in Salerno, he had first been a monk at Cava under Leo I of Cava.  He then was at Cluny from 1062 to 1068 and later became bishop of Policastro in 1079.

He later resigned his see and returned to Cava. Abbot Leo I appointed him coadjutor. When Peter became abbot himself, his administration was so strict that he caused strife in the abbey.  He thus withdrew temporarily before being recalled and serving for several decades as abbot until his death.  He was succeeded by Constabilis, who had served as Peter's coadjutor.

Veneration
The first four abbots of Cava were officially recognized as saints on December 21, 1893, by Pope Leo XIII.  The first four abbots are Alferius (Alferio), the founder and first abbot (1050); Leo I (1050–79); Peter of Pappacarbone (1079–1123); and Constabilis.

Notes

External links
 San Pietro I (Pappacarbone) Abate di Cava
 San Constabile (Costabile)
Peter of Pappacarbone

1123 deaths
Italian saints
Bishops in Campania
Italian abbots
Italian Benedictines
11th-century Italian Roman Catholic bishops
12th-century Christian saints
Year of birth unknown